The Jackson Formation is a geologic formation in Tennessee. It preserves fossils dating back to the Paleogene period.
Exposed only in bluffs along Mississippi River with thickness at least 60 feet. Primary rock type is sand. Secondary rock type is clay or mud. Other rock types include slit and lignite. "Light gray to buff, medium- to very fine-grained silty sand, interbedded with light gray clayey silt." From the Tertiary geological age.

Jackson Formation siltstones are exposed in western Tennessee in the Mississippi River bluffs.

See also

 List of fossiliferous stratigraphic units in Tennessee
 Paleontology in Tennessee

References

 

Paleogene geology of Texas
Paleogene geology of Tennessee
Paleogene Mississippi